Mervyn William Cawston (born 4 February 1952) is an English former professional footballer who played as a goalkeeper. Active in both England and the United States, Cawston made over 300 career appearances.

Career
Born in Diss, Cawston played for Norwich City, Southend United, Chicago Sting, Newport County, Gillingham, Stoke City, Chelmsford City, Barking, Woodford Town, Maidstone United, Brighton & Hove Albion and Redbridge Forest.

He also played for England Schools.

Career statistics
Source:

References

1952 births
Living people
People from Diss, Norfolk
English footballers
Norwich City F.C. players
Southend United F.C. players
Newport County A.F.C. players
Chicago Sting (NASL) players
Gillingham F.C. players
Stoke City F.C. players
Chelmsford City F.C. players
Barking F.C. players
Woodford Town F.C. (1937) players
Maidstone United F.C. (1897) players
Brighton & Hove Albion F.C. players
Redbridge Forest F.C. players
Association football goalkeepers
English Football League players
North American Soccer League (1968–1984) players
English expatriate footballers
Expatriate soccer players in the United States
English expatriate sportspeople in the United States